Brunei International Airport (BIA) (Jawi: لاڤڠن تربڠ انتارابڠسا بروني ), is the primary of two airports in the Sultanate of Brunei Darussalam, on the island of Borneo.  Located near Bandar Seri Begawan in the Brunei-Muara District, it serves as the home base and hub for Royal Brunei Airlines (RB).  Additionally, the Royal Brunei Air Force (RBAirF) is also headquartered at Royal Brunei Air Force Base, Rimba, which is located opposite the main runway on the northern side, within the airport's environs.  Brunei International Airport serves international destinations across Asia and Oceania, as well as flights to the Middle East and London Heathrow.

History

Commercial air transport in Brunei began in 1953, with the establishment of air service links connecting Brunei Town (present-day Bandar Seri Begawan) with Anduki in the Belait District.  Initial flights linking Brunei to British Malaya, North Borneo, Sarawak, Singapore, and overseas destinations were primarily provided by Borneo Airways and Malayan Airways.  Airport services were operated from the Berakas area at an old runway site built by the Japanese during World War II.  It was known then as Brunei Airport.

The growth in popularity of air travel in the 1970s resulted in a significant increase in civil aviation.  Suddenly, the old airport was swamped with activity, operating beyond its capacity.  This situation prompted the government to scout for a new site to build a modern airport.  A new airport was constructed in Mukim Berakas in the Brunei-Muara District, because this location was easily accessible from all areas of the country.  The airport became operational in 1974, and its runway was one of the longest runways in the far east.

In 2008, it was announced that a study to review necessary expansions and modifications was completed, and a masterplan was written up soon after.  The masterplan consists of different phases, and Phase 1, which includes upgrading the existing passenger terminal building and the cargo terminal, is targeted to be completed by end of 2013.  Phase 1A was already completed on 1 October 2013, with the opening of the new arrival hall.  The capacity of the airport was to be increased to three million by end of 2014.  After Phase 1 is completed, Phase 2 could be initiated in 2022, which includes the construction of a new terminal, which will be able to accommodate up to eight million passengers.  Currently, the runway is being upgraded to allow bigger aircraft such as Airbus A380 and Boeing 747 to land easily.

Facilities
In 2005, Brunei International Airport handled 1.3 million passengers. Inside the international terminal, there are 40 check-in counters, 12 emigration counters, and 14 immigration clearance counters. Concessionary traders inside the terminal include Burger King and KFC international fast-food outlets, Jollibee regional fast food, plus local 'concept stores' which include food, tea and coffee drinks, and jewellery stores, along with Avis car rental desk. It also includes a VIP Lounge for business travellers. Brunei International Airport has car parking space for 1,440 cars, with a further 300 covered parking spaces.

Other facilities at BIA include a post office, bank, the Department of Civil Aviation (located within the air traffic control tower building), and the Brunei International Airport Mosque.

Access
The airport is located approximately 10 minutes from the centre of the capital.  Along with personal car rental options, there are regular taxi services to and from the airport, with a journey time of approximately 15 minutes.  There are also regular public bus services which go around the capital, taking approximately 30 minutes.  , taxi fares range from BND$10.00 to BND$20.00, and the bus fare was BND$2.00 (requiring exact fare only, as no change will be given).

Airlines and destinations

See also
List of airports in Brunei
Transport in Brunei

References

External links

Experience Brunei International Airport (BIA) — official website from Civil-Aviation.gov.bn (via Archive.org)
Ministry of Transport and Infocommunications (MTIC), Brunei Darussalam — at GOV.BN
Ministry of Transport and Infocommunications (MTIC) – directory — parent to the Department of Civil Aviation (DCA), at GOV.BN
SkyVector aviation chart for Brunei International Airport
SkyVector IFR chart for Brunei International Airport
Brunei International Airport (BWN/WBSB) live flight arrivals and departures — from FlightRadar24.com
Brunei International Airport (BWN/WBSB) live map — from FlightRadar24.com

1974 establishments in Brunei
Airports in Brunei
Airport